The Nudelman-Richter NR-23 is a Soviet autocannon widely used in military aircraft of the Soviet Union and Warsaw Pact. It was designed by A. E. Nudelman and A. A. Richter to replace the wartime Nudelman-Suranov NS-23 and Volkov-Yartsev VYa-23, entering service in 1949.

The NR-23 is a single-barrel, short recoil-operated 23 mm (0.90 in) cannon. It was similar to the NS-23 but mechanical improvements increased its rate of fire by more than 50%. Its theoretical rate of fire was 850 rounds per minute, although United States Air Force tests of captured weapons achieved an actual rate of fire of only 650 rounds per minute.

The NR-23 was later replaced by the Afanasev Makarov AM-23 automatic cannon which had a higher firing rate. The AM-23 was used in turreted installations for bombers. It was a gas-operated weapon, weighed 43 kg (95 lb) and was capable of a substantially higher rate of fire (1,200–1,300 rounds per minute).

The People's Republic of China manufactures copies of both versions of this weapon as Norinco Type 23-1 (NR-23) and Type 23-2 (AM-23), respectively.

Applications 
The NR-23 was used on fighter aircraft, including the MiG-15, Lavochkin La-15, MiG-17, and some models of the MiG-19. In addition, it was also used on the Ilyushin Il-28 and Beriev Be-6. The AM-23 was used in the defensive turrets of the Antonov An-12B, Myasishchev M-4, Tupolev Tu-14, Tupolev Tu-16, Tupolev Tu-95/Tu-142, and the Tupolev Tu-98 prototype.

The NR-23 is also the only cannon to have been fired in space. Published accounts state that a Nudelman-Richter gun was installed on Almaz 2 space station. On the final day of the Almaz 2's deployment, the cannons were tested by firing a total of 20 rounds. The details  of this test and its results remain classified.

In the mid-1960s the cannon was replaced in Soviet service by the twin-barrel Gryazev-Shipunov GSh-23L.

The mechanism of the NR-23 was scaled up to produce the more powerful NR-30 30 mm gun used in the MiG-19 and some marks of the MiG-21.

See also
Volkov-Yartsev VYa-23

Notes and references

Autocannons of the Soviet Union
Aircraft guns of the Soviet Union
23 mm artillery
Weapons and ammunition introduced in 1949